John D. Buckley (born 27 March 1967) is Professor of Military History at the University of Wolverhampton. He teaches and publishes on twentieth-century military history and strategic studies, especially on air power and the final year of World War II.

Career 
His books and articles analyse maritime air power in the inter-war period and during World War II, most notably a study of RAF Coastal Command, and on various other aspects of air power including strategic bombing, British inter-war defence policy, and air power and total war. His works include RAF and Trade Defence 1919-1945: Constant Endeavour (1995), Air Power in the Age of Total War (1999), British Armour in the Normandy Campaign (2004) and the edited collection, The Normandy Campaign 1944: Sixty Years On (2006). With George Kassimeris, he is editor of The Ashgate Companion to Modern Warfare (2009).

His most recent work is Monty's Men: The British Army and the Liberation of Northwest Europe, 1944-5, which analyzes the performance of the British Army during the final stage of World War II.

Books
Buckley has published books, articles and conference papers including:

 RAF and Trade Defence 1919-1945: Constant Endeavour (1995). 
 Air Power in the Age of Total War (1999). 
 British Armour in the Normandy Campaign (2004). 
 Editor, The Normandy Campaign 1944: Sixty Years On (2006). 
 Editor, with George Kassimeris, The Ashgate Companion to Modern Warfare. (2009),  London: Ashgate Publishing, .
 Monty's Men: The British Army and the Liberation of Europe, 1944-5. New Haven: Yale University Press, 2013.

Notes

British military writers
Air force historians
Living people
British military historians
Historians of armoured warfare
Academics of the University of Wolverhampton
1967 births